Ko Moo-yeol  (born 5 September 1990) is a South Korean footballer who plays as forward for Chungnam Asan in the K League 2.

Club career statistics

Honours

Club

 Pohang Steelers
 K League Classic (1): 2013
 Korean FA Cup (2): 2012, 2013

Jeonbuk Hyundai Motors
K League Classic (1) : 2017
AFC Champions League (1): 2016

External links 

1990 births
Living people
Association football forwards
South Korean footballers
Pohang Steelers players
Jeonbuk Hyundai Motors players
Asan Mugunghwa FC players
Chungnam Asan FC players
Gangwon FC players
K League 1 players
K League 2 players
Sportspeople from Busan
South Korean Buddhists